The Main Street Historic District is located in Mayville, Wisconsin.

History
The district is Mayville's old downtown. Buildings within it include the Beaumont Hotel, along with the 1866 Italianate Reible building, the pre-1873 Commercial Vernacular Simonin-Wolff-Faust Building, the 1891 Classical Revival Ruedebusch Department Store, the 1897 Queen Anne Hamm building, and the 1915 Modernist First National Bank.

References

Historic districts on the National Register of Historic Places in Wisconsin
National Register of Historic Places in Dodge County, Wisconsin